Peggy Ovire Enoho addressed commonly as Peggy is a Nigerian model, movie producer and actress who won the award for “Most Promising Actress Of The Year (English)” at the City People Entertainment Awards  2015 edition.

Early life and education
Ovire hails from Ughelli in Delta State, Nigeria. She was born into a family of six children of which she was the last born child of her parents. Ovire was born in Lagos state where she has now been living for the most part of her life. Ovire attended Itire Nursery and Primary School in Surulere and AUD Secondary School which is also situated in Surulere, Lagos State. 
Ovire for her post secondary school education enrolled in Delta State University, Abraka but eventually would complete it at Ambrose Alli University where she obtained a Bachelor of Science degree in Banking and Finance.

Career
Ovire before her debut into the Nigerian movie industry Nollywood, began her career as a model as she described in an interview with The Punch print media house. She further explained her first ever movie was one produced by Uche Nancy. Ovire’s movie career came into limelight with her role in the TV series titled Husbands of Lagos. Ovire claimed the TV series brought her notability and she had become recognizable outside of her home country Nigeria. she was part of the cast crew in Rising Sun alongside Ifeanyi Kalu.

Awards and nominations
Ovire won the award for Most Promising Actress of the Year (English) at the 2015 City People Entertainment Awards.

Movie production
In addition to being an actress and a model, Ovire is a film producer who has worked on films including Ufuoma, Fool Me Once, and The Other Woman.

Selected filmography and TV series 
A Long Night
Royal Switch
Game Changer
Husbands of Lagos (TV series)
Playing with Heart
Marry Me Yes or No
The Apple of Discord 
Last Engagement
Second Chances(2014) as Lolade
Ghetto bred
Grey
Loving Ellen
11th thought
A taste of grief
Long shadow
Hell proof
Baby boy
For better for trouble
Rising Sun

References

External links
 Peggy Ovire IMDb Page

Living people
21st-century Nigerian actresses
Year of birth missing (living people)
Actresses from Delta State
Actresses from Lagos State
Nigerian film actresses
Nigerian television actresses
Ambrose Alli University alumni
Nigerian film producers
Nigerian women film producers
Nigerian models
Nigerian female adult models